The Peyton and Barber Professorship of Music is a named chair at the University of Birmingham. It was established in 1904 when Richard Peyton, a local businessman, endowed it with £10,000. The inaugural holder was the composer Edward Elgar, who left the post in 1908. As of 2018, the chair is held by Andrew Kirkman.

Peyton and Barber Professors of Music 
 1904–1908: Sir Edward William Elgar, 1st Baronet, OM, GCVO.
 1908–1934: Sir Granville Ransome Bantock.
 1934–1944: Christian Victor Noel Hope Hely-Hutchinson.
 1944–1946: Sir Jack Allan Westrup.
 1947–1968: Sir Anthony Carey Lewis, CBE.
 1968–1986: Ivor Christopher Banfield Keys, CBE.
 1987–1992: Samuel Basil Deane.
 1992–2012: Colin Ronald Timms.
 2013–present: Andrew Kirkman.

References 

University of Birmingham